The Marathon Runner is a 1933 German sports film directed by Ewald André Dupont and starring Brigitte Helm, Hans Brausewetter and Ursula Grabley. It was based on a 1928 novel by Werner Scheff, adapted by screenwriter Thea von Harbou. The film focuses on a love triangle between three German athletes competing at the 1932 Olympic Games in Los Angeles. It was shot at the Johannisthal Studios in Berlin with sets designed by the art directors Ernő Metzner and Erich Zander. The German premiere took place at the Ufa-Palast am Zoo. It was the last film Dupont made in Germany, before escaping into exile following the rise to power of the Nazis.

Cast
 Brigitte Helm as Lore Steinkopf
 Hans Brausewetter as Karl Roesicke
 Ursula Grabley as Else Wittig, Lores Freundin
 Viktor de Kowa as Georg Cornelius
 Paul Hartmann as José Barrada
 Trude von Molo as Evelyne Barrada
 Oscar Sabo as Werner Franck, Trainer
 Carl Balhaus as Hans Huber
 Nien Soen Ling as Tschou Ling
 Alfred Durra as Ein Reporter

References

Bibliography

External links

1933 films
Films of the Weimar Republic
1930s sports films
German sports films
1930s German-language films
Films directed by E. A. Dupont
Films set in Los Angeles
1932 Summer Olympics
Films about the 1932 Summer Olympics
Films about Olympic track and field
Running films
Films with screenplays by Thea von Harbou
German black-and-white films
1930s German films
Films shot at Johannisthal Studios